Kalateh-ye Motahhari (also Romanized as Kalāteh-ye Moţahharī; also known as Deh-e Moţahharī) is a village in Kharturan Rural District, Beyarjomand District, Shahrud County, Semnan Province, Iran. At the 2006 census, its population was 72, in 18 families.

References 

Populated places in Shahrud County